Hopfer is a German surname. Notable people with the surname include:

Bartholomäus Hopfer (1628–1699), German artist
Daniel Hopfer (c. 1470 – 1536), German artist
Liselotte Hopfer, German luger
Thomas Hopfer (born 1990), Austrian footballer

See also
Hopfner (disambiguation), a similarly spelled surname

German-language surnames

de:Hopfer